Pericycos varieguttatus is a species of beetle in the family Cerambycidae. It was described by Bernhard Schwarzer in 1926. It is known from Sumatra.

References

Lamiini
Beetles described in 1926